Ellington Township is one of sixteen townships in Hancock County, Iowa, USA.  As of the 2000 census, its population was 550.

History
Ellington Township was organized in 1861.

Geography
According to the United States Census Bureau, Ellington Township covers an area of 35.74 square miles (92.57 square kilometers); of this, 35.68 square miles (92.42 square kilometers, 99.84 percent) is land and 0.06 square miles (0.15 square kilometers, 0.16 percent) is water.

Cities, towns, villages
 Forest City (east edge)

Unincorporated towns
 Miller at 
(This list is based on USGS data and may include former settlements.)

Adjacent townships
 Mount Valley Township, Winnebago County (north)
 Fertile Township, Worth County (northeast)
 Grant Township, Cerro Gordo County (east)
 Clear Lake Township, Cerro Gordo County (southeast)
 Concord Township (south)
 Garfield Township (southwest)
 Madison Township (west)
 Forest Township, Winnebago County (northwest)

Cemeteries
The township contains these three cemeteries: Ellington, Ellington Prairie and Pilot Knob Lutheran.

Lakes
 Deadman's Lake
 Pilot Knob Lake

Landmarks
 Pilot Knob State Park

School districts
 Forest City Community School District
 Garner-Hayfield-Ventura Community School District

Political districts
 Iowa's 4th congressional district
 State House District 11
 State Senate District 6

References
 United States Census Bureau 2008 TIGER/Line Shapefiles
 United States Board on Geographic Names (GNIS)
 United States National Atlas

External links
 US-Counties.com
 City-Data.com

Townships in Hancock County, Iowa
Townships in Iowa